The Dewar (Dhibara) are a scheduled caste from Indian states Chhattisgarh, Odisha and Madhya Pradesh. They are fishing communities.

Subgroups
They are said to be the following: 
Keuta (Kaibartha)
Nialis
Rarhis
Machhua
Siuli
Kedar
Gunduri
Girigiria
Malha
Nauri

References

Scheduled Castes
Social groups of Chhattisgarh
Social groups of Madhya Pradesh
Social groups of Odisha
Fishing castes